The slip knot is a stopper knot which is easily undone by pulling the tail (working end). The slip knot is related to the running knot, which will release when the standing end is pulled. Both knots are identical and are composed of a slipped overhand knot, where a bight allows the knot to be released by pulling on an end; the working end for a slip knot, and the standing end for a running knot. The slip knot is used as a starting point for crochet and knitting.

Standard creation

The slip knot is formed by first creating a loop in the shape of a "p". Place a hand or hook through the loophole and grab a bight on the working end. Draw this bight through the first loop. Seat the knot and pull the bight until a small loop is created.

See also
 Knot
 List of knots

References

External links
 Animated tying instructions
 Slip knot 3d model 

 Knots

ru:Бегущий булинь